Fr. Paddy Gantly (1919–2002) was an Irish sportsperson. He played hurling at various times with his local clubs Ardrahan in Galway and St Finbarr's in Cork. Gantly also played at senior level for the Galway county team from 1945 until 1949. He is regarded as one of Galway’s greatest-ever players.

1919 births
2002 deaths
Ardrahan hurlers
St Finbarr's hurlers
Galway inter-county hurlers
Connacht inter-provincial hurlers